Celebrity Duets: Philippine Edition is a Philippine television interactive reality-based singing competition show broadcast by GMA Network. Hosted by Ogie Alcasid and Regine Velasquez, it premiered on August 11, 2007. The show concluded on November 14, 2009. It was replaced by Kakasa Ka Ba sa Grade 5? in its time slot.

Cast

Season 1

Judges
Mitch Valdez - Comedian and stage performer
Louie Ocampo - Composer and arranger
Buboy Garovillo - Member of APO Hiking Society

Contestants

Notes
 On October 20, 2007 finals night, three contestants competed for the title of Celebrity Duets Champion.

Duet partners

Season 2

Judges
 Freddie Santos - Veteran concert & theatre director
 Danny Tan - Renowned composer & arranger
 Tessa Prieto-Valdez - Celebrity Duets 1st grand winner & socialite

Contestants

Duet partners

Season 3

Judges
 Freddie Santos - Veteran concert & theatre director
 Danny Tan - Renowned composer & arranger
 Tessa Prieto-Valdez - Celebrity Duets 1st grand winner & socialite

Contestants

Duet partners

Ratings
According to AGB Nielsen Philippines' Mega Manila household television ratings, the final episode of Celebrity Duets: Philippine Edition scored a 17.8% rating.

Accolades

References

External links
 

2007 Philippine television series debuts
2009 Philippine television series endings
Filipino-language television shows
GMA Network original programming
Philippine reality television series
Philippine television series based on American television series
Television series by Fremantle (company)